Stamatis Kokotas (Greek: Σταμάτης Κόκοτας, 23 March 1937 – 1 October 2022) was a Greek folk singer.

Life and career 
Born in Athens, the son of a doctor, Kokotas moved to Paris to study medicine, and there he became friend of Stavros Xarchakos, who introduced him to the music and contributed to launch his career. He had his breakout in 1966 with the hit "Στου Όθωνα τα χρόνια" ("In the days of King Otto"). Other major hits include the songs "Oniro απατηλό" ("Illusory dream") and "γιe μου" ("My son"). His collaborations include Dimos Moutsis, Antonios Katinaris, Giorgos Hatzinasios, Giorgos Zampetas, Giannis Spanos.

Kokotas died after a four year battle with cancer on 1 October 2022, at the age of 85.

References

External links 
  
 

1937 births
2022 deaths 
Singers from Athens
Greek pop singers
Greek folk singers
Greek male singers